ALG Spor, formerly known as Güneykent Spor, is a women's football club based in Gaziantep, southeastern Turkey. Founded in 1998. The club is named after its local sponsor ALG Textile. The club's president is Ali Gözcü. It is located in the İncilipınar neighborhood of Şehitkamil district. The team play their home matches at the Batur Stadium.

History 

The club was founded as Güneykent Spor in Gaziantep.
ALG Spor started playing league matches by entering the Group 6 of the  2015–16 Turkish Women's Third Football League season. They finished the season runners-up in the group. The next season, the team became runners-up at the end of the play-offs, and was entitled to play in the Turkish Women's Second Football League. They finished the 2017–18 Women's Second League season as champion after the play-offs, and were so promoted to the Women' First League for the 2018–19 season.

To strengthen the team for the matches in the Women's First League, the club transferred three experienced footballers, Yaşam Göksu, Fatoş Yıldırım, Gülbin Hız from Konak Belediyespor and Second-League striker Ebru Atıcı from Hakkarigücü Spor in the summer of 2018. Further transfers were local players Remziye Bakır, Mislina Gözükara and Fatma Songül. In the beginning of the second half of the 2018–19 season, the club transferred the Ukrainian striker Tetyana Kozyrenko. ALG Spor finished their first season in the Women's First League as runner-up behind Beşiktaş J.K. losing the champion title only in the last league round equal on points but with goal average. ALG Spor, the leader of the previous two rounds with goal average,  won their last match with 5-1, Beşiktaş J.K. defeated their opponent by 9-0, which enabled them a goal average of four in the final. The Turkish Football Federation set a play-off round between the two teams to be played on 12 May 2019 at a neutral venue, in Manavgat, Antalya. The team became runners-up after losing to Beşiktaş J.K. in the play-off match with 0-1.

The 2019-20 First League season was discontinued on 19 March 2020 according to an announcement by the Youth and Sports Ministry including from the round 17 on due to the COVID-19 pandemic in Turkey. The Turkish Football Federation decided on 8 July 2020 that the further matches will not be played, the league will be registered according to the score ranking on the date when the league was stopped, no champion will be declared, and the top-ranking team ALG Spor, are to represent Turkey at the 2020–21 UEFA Women's Champions League.

ALG Spor played in the first qualifying round of the 2020–21 UEFA Women's Champions League against Albanian team KFF Vllaznia Shkodër on 3 November 2020. The team were eliminated after losing the penalty shout-out by 2-3 following a draw by 2-2 in the regular time and subsequently another draw by 3-3 after extra time.

ALG Spor finished the 2021-22 Women's Super  League season as Group B leader and became league champion after the play-offs. The team was entitled to represent Turkey at the 2022–23 UEFA Women's Champions League. They were eliminated in the First qualifying round Tournament 11's first match after losing 0-1 to SK Brann Kvinner from Norway.

Stadium 
ALG Spor play their home matches in the Batur Stadium located in Şahinbey district of Gaziantep.

Statistics 
.

(1): three penalty points had been deducted imposed by the Turkish Football Federation.
(2): Season discontinued. No league champion was declared.
(3): League champion after Group leadership and play-offs
(4): Season in progress

Players

Current squad 

Head coach:  Hasan Vural

Notable players

Former managers

International results

Honours 
Turkish Women's Football Super League
 Champions (1): 2021–22
 First Place (1): 2019–20 (1)
 Runners-up (1): 2018–19

Turkish Women's Second Football League
 Champions (1): 2017–18

Turkish Women's Third Football League
 Runners-up (1): 2016-17

Note:
(1) declared league first, not a champion. Season discontinued. No league champion was declared.

Kit history

Squad history

References 

 
1998 establishments in Turkey
Association football clubs established in 1998
Şehitkamil District